Mihimaru GT were an urban and pop music group signed to Universal Music Japan and managed by Tearbridge Productions, a subsidiary of Stardust Promotion and Avex.

History 
Mihimaru GT was a Japanese duet made up of composer, lyricist and vocalist, Miyake as well as vocalist and lyricist Hiroko. The group was formed due to the joint management of the two members during their solo careers. Before forming Mihimaru GT, each member had a relatively quiet career, with little to no major hits.

To remind each other that the success of the group comes from the hard work and contributions of both members, the name Mihimaru GT was created for the band, taking the first two letters in each members' first name and adding "maru", or "perfection", to the end of it, as well as the initials for Miyake's favorite video game—Gran Turismo.

Unlike many other groups, Mihimaru GT often recorded songs featuring only one of their members, though because of each members' background, they were both involved with every song in some way. Hiroko was usually responsible for the main melody of the song, whereas Miyake was featured in the rap that may appear in a song. The band is known for its urban and pop-oriented songs, as well as slow ballad oriented songs. They were signed to one of the largest independent music labels in the world.

Prior to 2006, they have had an average career, with their singles ranking no higher than #16 on the Oricon charts. In 2006, however, their single, "Kibun Jojo" became the commercial song for Dariya's "Palty" and music.jp's commercial theme, as well as the ending theme for the variety program "Sukibara". The triple tie-up gave them considerable media exposure, and more people began to take notice of them. On May 5, 2006, they performed on the popular music show Music Station and was featured on the "Young Guns" corner. The appearance on the show boosted their popularity and made "Kibun Jojo" onto the #7 spot on the Oricon charts.

From then on, their sales peaked and eventually bottomed out, though "Itsumademo Hibiku Kono Melody/Magical Speaker" managed to reach as high as #3 on the Oricon charts.

The song "H.P.S.J." was featured as the third ending song for the anime Bobobo-bo Bo-bobo; "Kibun Jojo" itself has been covered in rhythm action games such as Taiko: Drum Master, Moero! Nekketsu Rhythm Damashii Osu! Tatakae! Ouendan 2 and you can dance to the song in Happy Dance collection for Nintendo Wii.

On November 7, Mihimaru GT released a hip-hop re-arrangement/cover of Kylie Minogue's "I Should Be So Lucky" as a double A-side single (the other A-side being Ai Kotoba.) The song, "I Should Be So Lucky", was used as the ending theme for the Japanese drama Abarenbou Mama (Wild Mama) which stars Aya Ueto.

"Girigiri Hero" is featured in the movie Shaoulin Shojou.

"Switch" was used for the 2009 World Table Tennis Championship in Japan.

The duo's most recent single, Masterpiece was used as a main theme for the TV animation Yu-Gi-Oh! Zexal.

In April 2011, the duo performed with Korean singer Park Jung Min at an UN Charity Concert in Yokohama, Japan to aid victims of the 2011 Tōhoku earthquake and tsunami.

In 2013, the group went on indefinite hiatus, intending to focus on their individual activities.

Discography

Singles

Albums

References

External links 
  Official Mihimaru GT website
  Official Universal Music Japan profile
  mihimacafe forum
  Official mihamaru GT blog

Japanese pop music groups
Japanese musical duos
Universal Music Japan artists
Stardust Promotion artists
Musical groups disestablished in 2013
Musical groups from Tokyo